Igor Aleksandrovich Levitsky (born 8 April 1993) is a Russian ice hockey player. He is currently playing with Zvezda Moscow of the Supreme Hockey League (VHL). He has previously played in the Kontinental Hockey League (KHL) between 2013 and 2019.

Levitsky made his KHL debut with Atlant Moscow Oblast during the 2013–14 KHL season.

References

External links
 

1993 births
Living people
Atlant Moscow Oblast players
Buran Voronezh players
Russian ice hockey left wingers
Gatineau Olympiques players
HC CSKA Moscow players
HC Sibir Novosibirsk players
HC Sochi players
HC Spartak Moscow players
Kazzinc-Torpedo players
Krasnaya Armiya (MHL) players
Zvezda Moscow players